School of Public Health may refer to one or more of the following educational institutions offering instruction in public health or related fields:

Africa 
 Makerere University School of Public Health, Makerere University College of Health Sciences, Kampala, Uganda
 University of Zambia School of Public Health, Lusaka, Zambia

Asia 
 Hanoi School of Public Health, Hanoi, Vietnam

Europe 
 Andalusian School of Public Health, Granada, Spain
 National School of Public Health (Spain), Carlos III Health Institute, Madrid, Spain

North America

Canada 
 Dalla Lana School of Public Health, University of Toronto, Toronto, Ontario

United States 
 Boston University School of Public Health, Boston University, Boston, MA
 Brown University School of Public Health, Brown University, Providence, RI
 Columbia University Mailman School of Public Health, Columbia University, New York City, NY
 Colorado School of Public Health, Colorado
 CUNY Graduate School of Public Health & Health Policy, City University of New York, New York City, NY
 Drexel University School of Public Health, Drexel University, Philadelphia, PA
 Graduate School of Public Health, San Diego State University, San Diego, CA
 Harvard T.H. Chan School of Public Health, Harvard University, Boston, MA
 Herbert Wertheim School of Public Health and Human Longevity Science, University of California, San Diego, San Diego, CA
 Indiana University School of Public Health-Bloomington,  Indiana University Bloomington, Bloomington, IN
 Johns Hopkins Bloomberg School of Public Health, Johns Hopkins University, Baltimore, MD
 Joseph J. Zilber School of Public Health, University of Wisconsin–Milwaukee, Milwaukee, WI
 Milken Institute School of Public Health, George Washington University, Washington D.C.
 Rollins School of Public Health, Emory University,  Atlanta, GA
 Rutgers School of Public Health, Rutgers University, New Jersey
 Texas A&M School of Public Health, Texas
 Tulane University School of Public Health and Tropical Medicine, Tulane University, New Orleans, LA
 UCLA Fielding School of Public Health, University of California, Los Angeles, Los Angeles, CA
 University of California, Berkeley School of Public Health, University of California, Berkeley, Berkeley, CA
 University of Maryland School of Public Health, University of Maryland, College Park, College Park, MD
 University of Michigan School of Public Health, University of Michigan, Ann Arbor, MI
 University of Minnesota School of Public Health, University of Minnesota, Minneapolis, MN
 University of Pittsburgh Graduate School of Public Health, University of Pittsburgh, Pittsburgh, PA
 University of Washington School of Public Health, University of Washington, Seattle, WA
 UNC Gillings School of Global Public Health, University of North Carolina at Chapel Hill, Chapel Hill, NC
 UTHealth School of Public Health, University of Texas Health Science Center at Houston, Houston, TX
 West Virginia University School of Public Health, West Virginia University, Morgantown, WV
 Yale School of Public Health, Yale University, New Haven, CT